Pewaukee is a city in Waukesha County, Wisconsin. The population was 15,914 at the 2020 census. The Village of Pewaukee, which was incorporated out of the town before it incorporated as a city, is surrounded by the city.

The name of the city of Pewaukee comes from that of the name of the village, which is rather unclear in itself. Many names are given as to the etymology of the name.

History
The city of Pewaukee was incorporated in 1999, from the parts of the former Town of Pewaukee not included in the Village of Pewaukee.

The town had been established by an act of the Wisconsin Territorial Legislature approved January 13, 1840, eight years before Wisconsin gained statehood.

When voting took place to decide the county seat for Waukesha County, Waukesha beat out Pewaukee by two votes. At the time, Governor Tyler Novak represented Pewaukee in court.

The Chicago, Milwaukee, St. Paul and Pacific Railroad (Milwaukee Road) constructed a railroad line through Pewaukee in 1855, followed by the Wisconsin Central Railroad in 1885. These railroads ran through the neighborhood of Duplainville, Wisconsin. Today, these lines are operated by the Canadian Pacific Railway and Canadian National Railway respectively.

Geography

Pewaukee is located at  (43.0614, −88.2495). It is located in the Lake Country area of Waukesha County.

Demographics

2010 census
As of the census of 2010, there were 13,195 people, 5,410 households, and 3,883 families residing in the city. The racial makeup of the city was 94.3% White, 1.1% African American, 0.3% Native American, 2.6% Asian, 0.5% from other races, and 1.2% from two or more races. Hispanic or Latino of any race were 2.1% of the population.

There were 5,410 households, of which 28.3% had children under the age of 18 living with them, 63.7% were married couples living together, 5.6% had a female householder with no husband present, 2.5% had a male householder with no wife present, and 28.2% were non-families. 23.2% of all households were made up of individuals, and 8.3% had someone living alone who was 65 years of age or older. The average household size was 2.42 and the average family size was 2.87.

The median age in the city was 45.3 years. 21.5% of residents were under the age of 18; 4.9% were between the ages of 18 and 24; 23% were from 25 to 44; 34.2% were from 45 to 64; and 16.3% were 65 years of age or older. The gender makeup of the city was 48.6% male and 51.4% female.

2000 census
As of the census of 2000, there were 11,783 people, 4,553 households, and 3,496 families residing in the city. The population density was 541.3 people per square mile (209.0/km2). There were 4,761 housing units at an average density of 218.7 per square mile (84.4/km2). The racial makeup of the city was 97.22% White, 0.35% Black or African American, 0.08% Native American, 1.07% Asian, 0.01% Pacific Islander, 0.44% from other races, and 0.84% from two or more races. Some 1.30% of the population were Hispanic or Latino of any race.

Approximately 31.5% of households had children under the age of 18 living with them, 69.2% were living together, 5.2% had a female householder with no husband present, and 23.2% were non-families. About 17.4% of all households were made up of individuals, and 4.4% had someone living alone who was 65 years of age or older. The average household size was 2.57 and the average family size was 2.93.

In the city, the population was spread out, with 23.1% under the age of 18, 5.8% from 18 to 24, 29.6% from 25 to 44, 30.8% from 45 to 64, and 10.8% who were 65 years of age or older. The median age was 40 years. For every 100 females, there were 99.5 males. For every 100 females age 18 and over, there were 98.2 males.

The median income for a household in the city was $75,589, and the median income for a family was $80,163. Males had a median income of $55,810 versus $35,320 for females. The per capita income for the city was $34,851. About 0.6% of families and 1.3% of the population were below the poverty line, including 1.0% of those under age 18 and 2.3% of those age 65 or over.

Business
Pewaukee is the world headquarters of Harken, Inc., a manufacturer of sailboat and yacht gear sold worldwide, especially in the racing segment.

Education 

Made up of four separate schools on one campus that encompass early childhood to the 12th grade, Pewaukee Schools surround a central parking lot ornamented with trees and grass. There are two gymnasiums in the high school, two in Horizon Elementary, and one in each of the other school buildings. The district has one football field with a track surrounding it and a soccer field. Pewaukee Lake Elementary school serves students from early childhood to 2nd grade. Horizon Elementary encompasses grades 3 through 5. Asa Clark Middle School educates the 6th through 8th grades. Pewaukee High School (PHS) is the high school, serving grades 9 through 12.

Pewaukee is also home to one Roman Catholic grade school: St. Anthony on the Lake. This educational institution serves students in kindergarten through 8th grade.

Waukesha County Technical College (WCTC), part of the Wisconsin Technical College System (WTCS), has a main campus located in Pewaukee.

Religion
The city is home to one of the largest churches in the Milwaukee area, Spring Creek Church. The Hindu Temple of Wisconsin is also located in the Village of Pewaukee. Other churches include Christ Evangelical Lutheran Church, Shepherd of the Hills Lutheran Church, Fox River Congregational Church, St. Anthony on the Lake Catholic Church, Gethsemane United Methodist Church, Crossroads Church, Galilee Lutheran Church, St. Bartholomew Episcopal Church, Joy Christian Fellowship Church, and Queen of Apostles Catholic Church.

Pewaukee Area Historical Society 
The Clark House Museum, located in the Village of Pewaukee, was originally a stage coach inn on the Watertown Plank Road that ran from Milwaukee to Watertown. The inn was built by Mosely Clark, the son of Pewaukee's first settler, Asa Clark. The Clark House remained in the Clark family until the death of Marietta Clark Larson, great-granddaughter of Asa, in 1984. In 1992 the Pewaukee Area Historical Society purchased the property.

The museum displays include an exhibits on Native American settlement with emphasis on the Potawatomi and Waukesha Beach, a popular amusement park on the shore of Pewaukee Lake. Pictures and artifacts portray a way of life from the early 1900s in the village and city. The exhibit building on the Clark House grounds, opened in 2007, houses larger artifacts, including farm machinery and a mail wagon.

Notable people

James R. Barnett, Wisconsin legislator
Walter G. Caldwell, Wisconsin legislator
Howard Engle (1919–2009), physician and lead plaintiff in a landmark lawsuit against the tobacco industry
Elihu Enos, Wisconsin educator and legislator
Margaret Farrow, Lieutenant Governor of Wisconsin
Ody J. Fish, Chairman of the Republican Party of Wisconsin
Benjamin F. Goss, legislator
Chauncey G. Heath, Wisconsin legislator
David Koepp, filmmaker
Chris McIntosh NFL player
Charles Henry Morgan, U.S. Representative from Missouri
Adam Neylon, Wisconsin legislator and business owner
Jessica Powers, Carmelite nun and author
Alvin J. Redford, Wisconsin legislator and sheriff
John C. Schafer, U.S. Representative
Kevin R. Slates, U.S. Navy admiral
William Henry Washburn, Wisconsin legislator
Derek Watt, fullback for the Pittsburgh Steelers
J. J. Watt, defensive end for the Arizona Cardinals
T. J. Watt, linebacker for the Pittsburgh Steelers

Media
Pewaukee, Wisconsin was referenced on the season 5 premiere of House M.D., "Dying Changes Everything".

See also
 List of cities in Wisconsin

References

External links

 
 Around the Corner with John McGivern -- Pewaukee Video produced by Milwaukee PBS

Cities in Wisconsin
Cities in Waukesha County, Wisconsin
Populated places established in 1999
1999 establishments in Wisconsin

es:Phillips (Wisconsin)